Dyo Vouna (meaning "two mountains") is a village on Mount Oeta in Phthiotis, Greece. Since the 2011 local government reform it is part of the municipality of Lamia, and of the municipal unit of Gorgopotamos. Population was 79 in the 2011 census.

It is the birthplace of Yiannis Dyovouniotis, a military leader of the Greek War of Independence.

References

Populated places in Phthiotis
Mount Oeta